Though Canary Islands geographically are part of the African plate and are generally considered part of the African continent, they administratively belong to Spain and therefore volcanoes of the islands are on this list.

See also
Lists of volcanoes in Europe by country
Volcanic Eifel

References

Europe